Jim Brown (born 11 August 1950) is a Scottish former footballer, who played for Heart of Midlothian, Hibernian and Dunfermline Athletic. He is most famous for suing a fellow footballer, John Pelosi, for the foul tackle which ended his career. Brown settled out of court a year later.

References

Sources

1950 births
Living people
Footballers from Edinburgh
Scottish footballers
Association football defenders
Scottish Football League players
Heart of Midlothian F.C. players
Hibernian F.C. players
Dunfermline Athletic F.C. players
Scottish Football League representative players